The 2004 Harrogate Council election took place on 10 June 2004 to elect members of Harrogate Borough Council in North Yorkshire, England. One third of the council was up for election and the Conservative Party stayed in overall control of the council.

After the election, the composition of the council was:
Conservative 29
Liberal Democrat 21
Independent 4

Campaign
Before the election the Conservatives ran the council with 28 seats, while the Liberal Democrats had 21 seats and there were 4 independents. The Conservatives had gained a majority after 2 Liberal Democrats defected to the Conservatives in autumn 2003. 16 seats were contested in the election, all from the rural areas of the council. The candidates in the election were 16 Conservatives, 16 Liberal Democrats, 2 independents and 1 candidate from the British National Party. The election was held under all postal voting, for the first time in Harrogate.

A significant issue in the election was the future of the Royal Hall in Harrogate. The Conservative administration refused to fund the restoration of the building and said they would consider financing other projects elsewhere in the council area from the money saved. However the Liberal Democrats would have put 2.6 million pounds towards restoring it, as they said future generations would have to spend even more if the council did not take action.

Election result
The results saw the Conservatives stay in control, with no change in the party composition of the council. The Conservatives gained Lower Nidderdale from the Liberal Democrats, but Conservative cabinet member Brian Lumsden was defeated in Boroughbridge by Liberal Democrat Peter Phillips, in what had been considered a safe seat. The Conservatives won 62.5% of the vote, compared to 34.2% for the Liberal Democrats. As a result, the Conservatives remained on 29 seats, the Liberal Democrats on 21 and 4 independents.

Meanwhile, the British National Party came in last in the only seat they contested in Nidd Valley with 131 votes, with Leslie Ellington holding the seat for the Conservatives, after having defected from the Liberal Democrats since the 2003 election. Overall turnout in the election was 55.2%, an increase on the 34.7% in the 2003 election and the 38.7% at the 2002 election.

Ward results

References

2004
2004 English local elections
2000s in North Yorkshire